Edinburgh East and Musselburgh was a constituency of the Scottish Parliament (Holyrood). It elected one Member of the Scottish Parliament (MSP) by the plurality (first past the post) method of election. Also, however, it is one of nine constituencies in the Lothians electoral region, which elects seven additional members, in addition to nine constituency MSPs, to produce a form of proportional representation for the region as a whole.

For the Scottish Parliament election, 2011, Edinburgh East and Musselburgh is abolished. The successor constituencies are Edinburgh Eastern, and Midlothian North and Musselburgh.

Electoral region 
See also Lothians (Scottish Parliament electoral region) 

The other eight constituencies of the Lothians region were: Edinburgh Central, Edinburgh North and Leith, Edinburgh Pentlands, Edinburgh South, Edinburgh West, Linlithgow, Livingston and Midlothian.

The region covered the City of Edinburgh council area, the West Lothian council area, part of the Midlothian council area, and part of the East Lothian council area.

Constituency boundaries 

The Edinburgh East and Musselburgh constituency was created at the same time as the Scottish Parliament, in 1999, with the name and boundaries of an  existing Westminster constituency. In 2005, however, Scottish Westminster (House of Commons) constituencies were mostly replaced with new constituencies.

From the Scottish Parliament election, 2011, Edinburgh East and Musselburgh was abolished. Musselburgh now forms part of a newly shaped Midlothian North and Musselburgh, while eastern Edinburgh is brought together into a newly  named Edinburgh Eastern.

Council areas 

The Holyrood constituency covers an eastern portion of the City of Edinburgh council area and the Musselburgh portion of the East Lothian council area.

The rest of the city area is covered by five other constituencies, all also in the Lothians electoral region: Edinburgh South, Edinburgh Central, Edinburgh North and Leith, Edinburgh Pentlands, and Edinburgh West, which are all entirely within the city area. Edinburgh East and Musselburgh has boundaries with the Edinburgh South constituency, the Edinburgh Central constituency and the Edinburgh North and Leith constituency.

The rest of the East Lothian area is covered by the East Lothian constituency, which is in the South of Scotland electoral region.

Member of the Scottish Parliament 
Kenny MacAskill of the SNP, the Cabinet Secretary for Justice, had represented the seat since the 2007 election. He was previously an MSP for the Lothians regional list from 1999 to 2007.

Election results

See also
 Politics of Edinburgh

Footnotes 

Scottish Parliament constituencies and regions 1999–2011
Constituencies in Edinburgh
Musselburgh
1999 establishments in Scotland
Constituencies established in 1999
2011 disestablishments in Scotland
Constituencies disestablished in 2011
Politics of East Lothian